Astrophysical plasma is plasma outside of the Solar System. It is studied as part of astrophysics and is commonly observed in space. The accepted view of scientists is that much of the baryonic matter in the universe exists in this state.

When matter becomes sufficiently hot and energetic, it becomes ionized and forms a plasma. This process breaks matter into its constituent particles which includes negatively-charged electrons and positively-charged ions. These electrically-charged particles are susceptible to influences by local electromagnetic fields. This includes strong fields generated by stars, and weak fields which exist in star forming regions, in interstellar space, and in intergalactic space. Similarly, electric fields are observed in some stellar astrophysical phenomena, but they are inconsequential in very low-density gaseous mediums.

Astrophysical plasma is often differentiated from space plasma, which typically refers to the plasma of the Sun, the solar wind, and the ionospheres and magnetospheres of the Earth and other planets.

Observing and studying astrophysical plasma

Plasmas in stars can both generate and interact with magnetic fields, resulting in a variety of dynamic astrophysical phenomena. These phenomena are sometimes observed in spectra due to the Zeeman effect. Other forms of astrophysical plasmas can be influenced by preexisting weak magnetic fields, whose interactions may only be determined directly by polarimetry or other indirect methods. In particular, the intergalactic medium, the interstellar medium, the interplanetary medium and solar winds consist of diffuse plasmas.

Astrophysical plasma may also be studied in a variety of ways as they emit electromagnetic radiation across a wide range of the electromagnetic spectrum. Because astrophysical plasmas are generally hot, electrons in the plasmas are continually emitting X-rays through the process called bremsstrahlung. This radiation may be detected with X-ray telescopes located in the upper atmosphere or in space. Astrophysical plasmas also emit radio waves and gamma rays.

Possible related phenomena

Scientists are interested in active galactic nuclei because such astrophysical plasmas could be directly related to the plasmas studied in laboratories. Many of these phenomena seemingly exhibit an array of complex magnetohydrodynamic behaviors, such as turbulence and instabilities. Although these phenomena may occur on astronomical scales as large as the galactic core, many astrophysicists suggest that they do not significantly involve plasma effects but are caused by matter consumed by super massive black holes.

In Big Bang cosmology, the entire universe was in a plasma state prior to recombination. Afterwards, much of the universe reionized after the first quasars formed.

Studying astrophysical plasmas is part of mainstream academic astrophysics. Though plasma processes are part of the standard cosmological model, current theories indicate that they might have only a minor role to play in forming the very largest structures, such as voids, galaxy clusters and superclusters.

Early history

Norwegian explorer and physicist Kristian Birkeland predicted that space is filled with plasma. He wrote in 1913: Birkeland assumed that most of the mass in the universe should be found in "empty" space.

In 1937, plasma physicist Hannes Alfvén argued that if plasma pervaded the universe, then it could generate a galactic magnetic field. During the 1940s and 1950s, Alfvén developed magnetohydrodynamics which enables plasmas to be modeled as waves in a fluid. Alfvén received the 1970 Nobel Prize in Physics for this development. Alfvén later proposed this as the possible basis of plasma cosmology, although this theory has faced scrutiny.

See also
 List of plasma physics articles

References

External links
 "US / Russia Collaboration in Plasma Astrophysics"

Plasma physics
Solar phenomena
Space physics
 
Stellar phenomena